Godsend is a 2014 South Korean drama film directed by Si-hyun Moon. It was written by the art house moviemaker Kim Ki-duk.

Plot summary
A teenage girl is pregnant and prepared to give up her baby in exchange for an expensive car.

References

External links
 

South Korean drama films
2010s Korean-language films
2014 films
2010s South Korean films